The National Football Academy, commonly referred to as NFA, is a football academy based in Jalan Besar, Singapore. It was launched by the Football Association of Singapore on 13 August 2000 with the aim of developing Singapore's most promising young footballers. Trainees are scouted through a systematic talent identification process before being given the chance to develop their skills under some of the best youth coaches in the country. With teams at every age level from U-14 to U-18, the NFA co-ordinates the development of young Singaporean footballers at a national level through the domestic league system, international youth tournaments as well as overseas training attachments. 

The NFA Under-18 team is made up of promising Singaporean players under the age of 18 and serves as a feeder squad mainly to the Young Lions as well as other clubs in the Singapore Premier League. The FAS enters both the NFA Blues U-17 and NFA Reds U-18 teams in the Prime League, the official reserve league of the Singapore Premier League, to allow their players to gain more exposure and match experience by playing against older and more established players. The NFA U-15 and U-16 teams also participate in the annual Lion City Cup organised by the FAS since 2011.

The NFA has produced many graduates who went on to represent the Singapore national team.

NFA Under-15

NFA U-15 performance record at the Lion City Cup

NFA Under-16

NFA U-16 performance record at the Lion City Cup

NFA Under-17

The NFA Blues is based at the 3,200-seater Jurong West Stadium for its Prime League matches.

2014 Prime League squad

 (c)

NFA Under-18

 

The NFA Reds is based at the 3,000-seater Bukit Gombak Stadium for its Prime League matches.

2014 Prime League squad

 (c)

See also

Lion City Cup
Young Lions
Singapore national youth football team
Singapore national football team

References

2000 establishments in Singapore
Football academies in Asia
National football academies
Association football training grounds in Singapore